Ballynafid is a townland in County Westmeath, Ireland. This place name is not to be confused with Ballinafid and Ballinafid Lake which are in the neighbouring townland of Knightswood.

Ballynafid is one of 15 townlands of the civil parish of Leny in the barony of Corkaree in the Province of Leinster. The neighbouring townlands are: Culleendarragh to the north, Culleenabohoge and Knightswood to the east, Clanhugh Demesne and Portnashangan to the south and Heathland and Kilpatrick to the west.

In the 1911 census of Ireland there were 4 houses and 41 inhabitants in the townland.

References

External links
Ballynafid at the IreAtlas Townland Data Base
Ballynafid at Townlands.ie
Ballynafid at Logainm.ie

Townlands of County Westmeath